In the United Kingdom, statutory undertakers are the various companies and agencies given general licence to carry out certain development and highways works.

Generally these are utilities and telecoms companies or nationalised companies such as Network Rail. Those relating to transport that have a duty through enactment to railways, canals and roads are defined under the Environmental Protection Act 1990 ( 98.6).

In recognition of their special status, statutory undertakers have privileges regarding development and highways access. They are often exempt from planning permission for small works through the General Permitted Development Order 2015. They may undertake certain works on public highways under the street works sections of New Roads and Street Works Act 1991 (Sections 48 to 106 in England and Wales, and the next set of sections in Scotland). They must inform the local council of minor-scale planned works, giving notice, often less than seven days; however considerably greater in the case of full road closures and closures of trunk roads, bridges and other key infrastructure.

Before the 1991 deregulation the number of statutory undertakers was low – made up local and regional, gas, water and electricity boards and national telecoms providers. Since this date, it has increased. In most areas cable telecommunications companies and appointed contractors on behalf of local authorities have been granted a licence.  This tends to be broadly empowering yet is always subject to the requirements of the 1991 Act. Some have been granted a licence by the UK government departments responsible for electronic communications and transport.

New Roads and Street Works Act 1991
This act consists of 171 sections.

External links
 New Roads and Street Works Act 1991
 City of Westminster FAQ on street works involving statutory undertakers
 General Permitted Development Order 1995
  Environmental Protection Act 1990

See also
 Town and country planning in the United Kingdom
 Land use planning

Utilities of the United Kingdom